Angelika Waller (born 26 October 1944) is a German actress. She appeared in more than fifty films since 1962. Her first leading role was in the 1965 film The Rabbit Is Me, a film which was banned in East Germany and released only in 1989.

Selected filmography

References

External links 

1944 births
Living people
People from Gryfino County
People from the Province of Brandenburg
German film actresses